Bill Phillips (January 28, 1936, Canton, North Carolina – August 23, 2010) was an American country music singer. His professional music career started with the Old Southern Jamboree on WMIL in Miami in 1955.  He moved to Nashville in 1957 and worked with Johnnie Wright and Kitty Wells until the late 1970s. His biggest recording was entitled "Put It Off Until Tomorrow" which peaked on the country charts at No. 6 on April 2, 1966. The Decca recording featured uncredited harmony vocals by the song's composer, a very young and then little known Dolly Parton.

Discography

Albums

Singles

A"Little Boy Sad" peaked at No. 17 on the RPM Country Tracks chart in Canada.

References
Eng, Steve (1998). "Bill Phillips". In The Encyclopedia of Country Music. Paul Kingsbury, Editor. New York: Oxford University Press. p. 413.
The Top Country Singles by Joel Whitburn, 1994.
Obituary

1936 births
2010 deaths
People from Canton, North Carolina
American country singer-songwriters
Country musicians from North Carolina
Singer-songwriters from North Carolina
Decca Records artists